Cychrus gorodinskii is a species of ground beetle in the subfamily of Carabinae. It was described by Cavazzuti in 2001.

References

gorodinskii
Beetles described in 2001